John Brown (born 1922), also known as Jack Brown or Boris Brown, was a rower who competed for England.

Rowing career
Brown represented England and won a bronze medal in the double sculls with Ken Tinegate at the 1950 British Empire Games in Auckland, New Zealand.

Personal life
During the Games in 1950 he lived at Hume House, Sparrow Hill, Loughborough. He was a company director and was a member of the Loughborough Boat Club.

Brown was the son of Owen Alfred Brown (1883–1954). Following his father's death, Jack took over his father's business, alongside his brothers Owen and William. He married Catherine Williams in 1950.

References

1922 births
Possibly living people
Commonwealth Games bronze medallists for England
Commonwealth Games medallists in rowing
English male rowers
Rowers at the 1950 British Empire Games
Medallists at the 1950 British Empire Games